Osman Göçen (born 5 January 1997) is a Turkish freestyle wrestler. He is a member of Istanbul BB SK.

Career 
In 2019, he won one of the bronze medals in the men's 86 kg event at the World U23 Wrestling Championship in Budapest, Hungary. In 2020, he also won one of the bronze medals in his event at the Individual Wrestling World Cup held in Belgrade, Serbia.

In March 2021, he qualified at the European Qualification Tournament to compete at the 2020 Summer Olympics in Tokyo, Japan. He competed in the men's 86 kg event where he was eliminated in his second match.

In 2022, he won the gold medal in his event at the Yasar Dogu Tournament held in Istanbul, Turkey. He also won one of the bronze medals in the men's 86 kg event at the 2022 European Wrestling Championships held in Budapest, Hungary.  He also won one of the bronze medals in the men's 86 kg event at the 2021 Islamic Solidarity Games held in Konya, Turkey.

Major results

References

External links 
 

1997 births
Living people
Turkish male sport wrestlers
Wrestlers at the 2020 Summer Olympics
Olympic wrestlers of Turkey
European Wrestling Championships medalists
Islamic Solidarity Games competitors for Turkey
Islamic Solidarity Games medalists in wrestling
21st-century Turkish people